The 2014 Southeast Missouri State Redhawks football team represented Southeast Missouri State University as a member of the Ohio Valley Conference (OVC) during the 2014 NCAA Division I FCS football season. Led by first-year head coach Tom Matukewicz, the Redhawks compiled an overall record of 5–7 with a mark of 3–5 in conference play, tying for sixth place in the OVC. Southeast Missouri State played home games at Houck Stadium in Cape Girardeau, Missouri.

Schedule

Ranking movements

Coaching staff

References

Southeast Missouri State
Southeast Missouri State Redhawks football seasons
Southeast Missouri State Redhawks football